RespireRx Pharmaceuticals Inc. (formerly Cortex Pharmaceuticals, Inc.) is a pharmaceutical company based in Glen Rock, New Jersey specializing in positive allosteric modulators of the AMPA receptor known as Ampakines.

History
In February 2005, Cortex received U.S. Food and Drug Administration approval to begin Phase II clinical trials for CX717 for use as a treatment for Alzheimer’s, ADHD and Sleep disorders.In 2006, The FDA halted clinical trials for CX717 because they feared the drug was toxic. They later allowed testing to continue but at doses too low to have any effect.In July 2007, The FDA gave Cortex permission to continue with clinical trials for CX717, as a treatment for Alzheimer's disease.In September 2007, Cortex filed with the FDA to test CX717 as a treatment for ADHD.In October 2007, Dr. Pierre Tran became Chief Medical Officer at Cortex after the FDA refused to let the company proceed with Phase II clinical trials for CX717 as a treatment for ADHD.In March 2008, German regulators approved clinical studies for using CX717 to prevent breathing problems caused by opiate pain-killers. In May 2008, President and CEO Dr. Roger Stoll announced that he was resigning and would be replaced by Mark Varney.

On June 13, 2018, RespireRx Pharmaceuticals Inc. entered into a letter of intent with Noramco Inc., a producer of controlled substances bulk APIs for the pharmaceutical industry, pursuant to which the parties have entered into a 90-day period, during which they will negotiate a definitive agreement regarding the RespireRx’s development of dronabinol, a synthetic cannabinoid, also known as Δ9-tetrahydrocannabinol or Δ9-THC.

References

External links
RespireRx Pharmaceuticals Inc. official website

Companies traded over-the-counter in the United States
Pharmaceutical companies based in New Jersey